The word schoolmaster, or simply master, refers to a male school teacher. This usage survives in British private schools, both secondary and preparatory, and a few Indian boarding schools (such as The Doon School) that were modelled after British public schools, but is generally obsolete elsewhere.

Origins
The word “master” in this context translates the Latin word magister. In England, a schoolmaster was usually a university graduate, and until the 19th century the only universities were Oxford and Cambridge. Their graduates in almost all subjects graduated as Bachelors of Arts and were then promoted to Masters of Arts (magister artium) simply by seniority. The core subject in an English grammar school was Latin.

Usage

Where a school has more than one schoolmaster, a man in charge of the school is the headmaster, sometimes spelt as two words, "head master". This name survives in British independent schools, but it has been replaced by head teacher in most British publicly funded schools, although "headmaster" is often still used colloquially, particularly in grammar schools, and is equivalent to the principal in American schools.  The term "headmaster" also survives in some American and Commonwealth independent schools.

A range of other terms is derived from "schoolmaster" and "headmaster", including deputy headmaster (the second most senior teacher), senior master and second master (both used in some independent schools instead of deputy headmaster), and housemaster, the schoolmaster in charge of a boarding school house). Some independent schools use other titles for the head of the teaching staff, including "High Master" and "Rector".

The female equivalent of "schoolmaster" is schoolmistress, which is used with all the same prefixes.

The archaic term for the second schoolmaster in a school in England is usher.

See also
 Education in the United Kingdom

References

Bibliography
 Ascham, Roger. The schoolmaster: or, A plain and perfect way of teaching children to understand, write, and speak the Latin tongue (1570; Based on the edition reproduced by Menston Scolar Press, 1967) (Google books text)
 Edward Egglestone, The Schoolmaster in Literature (2003)

Titles
Education and training occupations
Education in the United Kingdom